The term cape has a different tradition of usage in the American Midwest along the Mississippi River.  The middle Mississippi River Valley once formed part of the French Colonies of Quebec and Louisiana, also referred to as Upper Louisiana (Haute-Louisiane) or the Illinois Country (Pays des Illinois). The Illinois Country also included the left bank of the Mississippi River in present-day Missouri.

The French explorers and mapmakers used the word cape (or in French, "cap") to describe the bluffs and promontories along the Mississippi River.  A "cap" could sit next to any body of water, not just the ocean.  Spanish authorities also used the term cabo (cape) for points on the Mississippi River. Along the Mississippi River between St. Louis and Cairo there are a number of capes of French origin.

See also 

 Cape (geography)

References 

Mississippi River
Louisiana (New France)
Landforms of Missouri
Pre-statehood history of Missouri